Mara Lis Marchizotti (born 16 June 1994) is an Argentine basketball player for Tomás de Rocamora and the Argentine national team.

She participated at the 2018 FIBA Women's Basketball World Cup.

References

External links

1994 births
Living people
Argentine expatriate basketball people in the United States
Argentine women's basketball players
Basketball players at the 2019 Pan American Games
Centers (basketball)
Basketball players from Buenos Aires
Pan American Games competitors for Argentina